Garrett Augustus Morgan, Sr. (March 4, 1877 – July 27, 1963) was an American inventor, businessman, and community leader. His most notable inventions were a traffic light and the gas mask) notably used in a 1916 tunnel construction disaster rescue. Morgan also discovered and developed a chemical hair-processing and straightening solution. He created a successful company based on his hair product inventions along with a complete line of haircare products and became involved in the civic and political advancement of African Americans, especially in and around Cleveland, Ohio.

Early life and education
Morgan was born in 1877 in Paris, Kentucky, an almost exclusively African American community outside Paris, Kentucky. His father was  Sydney Morgan, a son and freed slave of Confederate Gen John H. Morgan of Morgan's Raiders. His mother, also a freed slave, was Elizabeth Reed, daughter of Rev. Garrett Reed; she was part Native American. He had at least one sibling, a brother named Frank, who helped in the 1916 Lake Erie tunnel rescue. Morgan only received a sixth grade education at Branch Elementary School in Claysville, then moved in search of work at the age of 14 to Cincinnati, Ohio.

Career
He spent most of his teenage years working as a handyman for a Cincinnati landowner. Like many African American children growing up at the turn of the century, Morgan had to quit school at a young age to work full-time. Morgan was able to hire a tutor and continue his studies while working in Cincinnati. In 1895, he moved to Cleveland, where he began repairing sewing machines for a clothing manufacturer. This experience sparked Morgan's interest in how things worked, and he built a reputation for fixing them. His first invention, made during this period, was a belt fastener for sewing machines. Morgan also invented a zigzag attachment for sewing machines.

In 1907, Morgan opened a sewing machine shop. One year later, more conscious of his heritage, he helped start the Cleveland Association of Colored Men in 1908. One year later, he and his wife Mary Anne opened Morgan's Cut Rate Ladies Clothing Store. The shop, which made coats, suits, dresses, and other clothing, ultimately had 32 employees.

Around 1910, his interest in repairing other people's inventions waned, and he became interested in developing some of his own. He received his first patent in 1912. In 1913 he incorporated hair care products into his growing list of patents and launched the G. A. Morgan Hair Refining Company, which sold hair care products, including his patented hair straightening cream, a hair coloring, and a hair straightening comb invented by Morgan. He received a patent for his smoke hood design in 1914, the year he launched the National Safety Device Company. It is unknown whether the smoke hood brought him any commercial success. In 1916, Morgan rescued workers trapped in a water intake tunnel  beneath Lake Erie, using a hood fashioned to protect his eyes from smoke and featuring a series of air tubes that hung near the ground to draw clean air beneath the rising smoke.

Later in life he developed glaucoma and by 1943 was functionally blind. He had poor health the rest of his life, but continued to work on his inventions.  One of his last was a self-extinguishing cigarette, which used a small plastic pellet filled with water placed just before the filter. He died on July 27, 1963,  at age 86 and was buried at  the Lake View Cemetery in Cleveland.

Products and inventions

Hair care products
Morgan conducted experiments with a liquid that gave sewing machine needles a high polish that prevented the needle from burning fabric as it sewed. In 1905, Morgan accidentally discovered that the liquid could also straighten hair. He made the liquid into a cream and launched the G. A. Morgan Hair Refining Company to market it. He also made a black hair oil dye and invented a curved-tooth comb for hair straightening in 1910.

Smoke hood

Garrett Morgan invented a safety hood smoke protection device after seeing firefighters struggling to withstand the suffocating smoke they encountered in the line of duty. His device used a moist sponge to filter out smoke and cool the air. It also took advantage of the way smoke and fumes tend to rise to higher positions while leaving a layer of more breathable air below, by using an air intake tube that dangled near the floor. The  hood used a series of tubes to draw clean air of the lowest level the tubes could extend to. Smoke, being hotter than the air around it, rises, and by drawing air from the ground, the Safety Hood provided the user with a way to perform emergency respiration.  He filed for a patent on the device in 1912, and founded a company called the National Safety Device Company in 1914 to market it. He was able to sell his invention around the country, sometimes using the tactic of having a hired white actor take credit rather than revealing himself as its inventor. For demonstrations of the device, he sometimes adopted the disguise of "Big Chief Mason", a purported full-blooded Indian from the Walpole Island Indian Reserve in Canada. He would demonstrate the device by building a noxious fire fueled by tar, sulfur, formaldehyde and manure inside an enclosed tent. Disguised as Big Chief Mason, he would enter the tent full of black smoke, and would remain there for 20 minutes before emerging unharmed.

A successful demonstration was also given by the National Safety Device of Cleveland, Ohio. A representative of the company, Mr. Mason, entered a poisonous building with Morgan's hood on his head and remained in that environment for twenty minutes. The test was satisfactory according to Chief Stickle of the Cleveland Fire Department, who said that the device was much cheaper and simpler than the oxygen mask used during that time. Following the demonstration Chief Stickle recommended the purchase of several hoods for the fire department. Mr. Mason continued to make numerous demonstrations at Ravenna, Youngstown, Canton, and other neighboring cities where the device was proclaimed a success.  The purchase of Morgan's smoke helmet was not limited within the boundaries of fire departments in northeast Ohio. Many large cities throughout the United States had Morgan's smoke helmet in their fire departments, hospitals, asylums, and ammonia factories, and were using them satisfactorily. His safety hood device was simple and effective, whereas the other devices in use at the time were generally difficult to put on, excessively complex, unreliable, or ineffective. It was patented and awarded a gold medal two years later by the International Association of Fire Chiefs. Morgan's safety hood was used to save many lives during the period of its use. By World War I, his breathing device was refined to carry its own air supply, making it a gas mask. However, upon their entry into the First World War, the United States Army adopted the British Small Box Respirator and French M2 Respirator as their standard anti-gas equipment, the former invented by Newfoundlander Cluny MacPherson.

He also developed later models that incorporated an airbag that could hold about 15 minutes of fresh air.

His invention became known nationally when he led a rescue that saved several men's lives after a July 24, 1916, tunnel explosion under Lake Erie. Before Morgan arrived, two previous rescue attempts had failed. The attempted rescuers had become victims themselves by entering the tunnel and not returning. Morgan was roused in the middle of the night after one of the members of the rescue team who had seen a demonstration of his device sent a messenger to convince him to come and to bring as many of his hoods as he could. He arrived on the scene still wearing his pajamas, and brought his brother Frank and four of the hoods with him.  Most of the rescuers on the scene were initially skeptical of his device, so he and his brother went into the tunnel along with two other volunteers, and succeeded in pulling out two men from the previous rescue attempts.  He emerged carrying a victim on his back, and his brother followed just behind with another. Others joined in after his team succeeded, and rescued several more. His device was also used to retrieve the bodies of the rescuers that did not survive.  Morgan personally made four trips into the tunnel during the rescue, and his health was affected for years afterward from the fumes he encountered there.  Cleveland's newspapers and city officials initially ignored Morgan's act of heroism as the first to rush into the tunnel for the rescue and his key role as the provider of the equipment that made the rescue possible, and it took years for the city to recognize his contributions. The mayor of that time Harry L Davis failed to put Garrett Morgan's name on the list of recommended heroes. City officials requested the Carnegie Hero Fund Commission to issue medals to several of the men involved in the rescue but excluded Morgan from their request. He believed that the omission was racially motivated.  Morgan's suspicions were confirmed by Victor M Sincere of the Bailey Company in his statement to the Citizens Award Committee." Your deed should serve to help break down the shafts of prejudice with which you struggle. And is sure to be the beacon of light for those that follow you in the battles of life." Later, in 1917, a group of citizens of Cleveland tried to correct for the omission by presenting him with a diamond-studded gold medal. After the heroic rescue Morgan's company received order requests from fire departments all over the country. However, the national news contained photographs of him, and officials in a number of southern cities canceled their existing orders when they discovered he was black.  Morgan said in his diary," I had but a little schooling, but I am a graduate from the school of hard knocks and cruel treatment. I have personally saved nine lives."

He was also given a medal from the International Association of Fire Engineers, which made him an honorary member.

Morgan's invention of the safety hood was featured on the television show Inventions that Shook the World and Mysteries at the Museum (S08E05).

Community leadership
In 1908, he co-founded the Cleveland Association of Colored Men, which later merged with the National Association for the Advancement of Colored People. Morgan served as its treasurer. He was a member of the NAACP and donated money to historically black colleges and universities.

Morgan, in 1920, founded the Cleveland Call, a weekly newspaper and, in 1938, subsequently participated in its merger that created the Cleveland Call and Post newspaper.  Morgan purchased a farm near Wakeman, Ohio, and upon that land build the Wakeman Country Club, open to Blacks, unlike most country clubs then.

Morgan was a member of the Prince Hall Freemasons, in Excelsior Lodge No. 11 of Cleveland, Ohio. He belonged to Antioch Baptist Church.

In 1931, seeing that the city was neither properly addressing the needs of its African American citizens, he ran for a seat on the Cleveland City Council as an independent, but was not elected.

Personal life
He married Madge Nelson in 1896, only to divorce in 1898. In 1908, he and Mary Hasek were married. Together, they had three children: John P., Garrett A. Jr., and Cosmo H. Morgan. Garrett died in Cleveland in 1963, where he was buried in Lake View Cemetery.

Awards and recognitions

At the Emancipation Centennial Celebration in Chicago, Illinois, in August 1963 (one month after his death), Morgan was nationally recognized.

In the Cleveland, Ohio area, the Garrett A. Morgan Cleveland School of Science and the Garrett A. Morgan Water Treatment Plant were named in his honor, along with an elementary school in Chicago. An elementary school bearing his name opened in the fall of 2016 in Lexington, Kentucky. In Prince George's County, Maryland, there is a street named Garrett A. Morgan Boulevard (formerly Summerfield Boulevard until 2002) and the adjacent Metro stop (Morgan Boulevard) also bears his name.

Morgan was included in the 2002 book 100 Greatest African Americans by Molefi Kete Asante.

Morgan is an honorary member of Alpha Phi Alpha fraternity.

References

Further reading

External links

The Encyclopedia of Cleveland History—Waterworks Disasters
Images from Morgan's patents

1877 births
1963 deaths
People from Harrison County, Kentucky
People from Paris, Kentucky
Businesspeople from Cleveland
Burials at Lake View Cemetery, Cleveland
African-American inventors
Traffic signals
20th-century African-American people
20th-century American inventors
Inventors from Kentucky